Rothschild's skink (Paracontias rothschildi) is a species of skinks. It is endemic to Madagascar.

References

Paracontias
Reptiles described in 1905
Reptiles of Madagascar
Taxa named by François Mocquard